Alfred Frodsham ( – ) was an English professional rugby league footballer who played in the 1920s and 1930s, and coached in the 1940s.

Background
Alf Frodsham's birth was registered in Prescot district, Lancashire, England.

International honours
Alf Frodsham won caps for England while at St. Helens in 1927 against Wales, and in 1928 against Wales, and won caps for Great Britain while at St. Helens in 1928 against New Zealand (2 matches), and in 1929 against Australia.

County Cup Final appearances
Alf Frodsham played right-, i.e. number 3, and scored a try in St. Helens' 10-2 victory over St Helens Recs in the 1926 Lancashire County Cup Final during the 1926–27 season at Wilderspool Stadium, Warrington on Saturday 20 November 1926, and played right-, i.e. number 3, in the 9-10 defeat by Warrington in the 1932 Lancashire County Cup Final during the 1932–33 season at Central Park, Wigan on Saturday 19 November 1932.

Genealogical information
Alf Frodsham was the older brother of the rugby league footballer for St. Helens; W. Harry Frodsham, and the rugby league footballer Eric Frodsham.

References

External links
Saints Heritage Society profile

1902 births
1974 deaths
England national rugby league team players
English rugby league coaches
English rugby league players
Great Britain national rugby league team players
Rugby league players from St Helens, Merseyside
Rugby league wingers
St Helens R.F.C. coaches
St Helens R.F.C. players
St Helens Recreation RLFC players